HEICS may refer to:
 Honourable East India Company Service
 Hospital Emergency Incident Command System